Estero Bay (Spanish for "Estuary") is a bay located on the Pacific Coast in San Luis Obispo County, central California. It is indented about  into the California coast.

Ecology
The Morro Bay kangaroo rat (Dipodomys heermanni morroensis ) is endemic to the Baywood fine sands habitats surrounding Morro Bay. It is a federally listed endangered species and on the IUCN Red List of Critically endangered species.

Morro Bay is located in the center of Estero Bay.

Features
Towns on the bay include Morro Bay, Baywood Park-Los Osos, and Cayucos.

For recreation beaches and parks are along the shore of the bay include: 
 Morro Strand State Beach
 Morro Bay State Park
 El Moro Elfin Forest Preserve — a 90-acre grove of 'pygmy oaks' (Coast live oak (Quercus agrifolia ). Located on the southeastern shore of Estero Bay in Los Osos. An oval wooden walkway loops around the forest, with viewing platforms.

See also
 Amphibious Training Base Morro Bay used the bay during World War 2.
California during World War II

References

External links

NOAA Nautical chart of Estero Bay http://www.charts.noaa.gov/OnLineViewer/18703.shtml

Bays of California
.
Bodies of water of San Luis Obispo County, California
Landforms of San Luis Obispo County, California